On October 23, 1907, a magnitude 5.9 earthquake struck Calabria, at a depth of 33.0 km. in the area of Gerace-Siderno, on the southeast coast of Calabria. The event caused 167 deaths and major damage.

The epicentral area included only one town (Ferruzzano), where many houses collapsed almost completely, and 158 persons, or 8% of its population, were killed. Ferruzano had been hit as well in the 1905 Calabria earthquake.

Almost a month later, on November 17, 1907, the area of Ferruzzano, Brancaleone and Bianco was hit again. On January 23, 1908, the area was hit again by an earthquake. People had to camp in the fields or in nearby subterranean grottos. In Ferruzzano new houses built after the earthquakes of 1905 and 1907 resisted the shocks of the 1908 Messina earthquake.

See also
 List of earthquakes in 1907
 List of earthquakes in Italy

References

1907 earthquakes
1907 Calabria
1907 in Italy
History of Calabria
October 1907 events
1907 disasters in Italy